Hla Nyunt (born 11 April 1938) is a Burmese boxer. He competed in the men's flyweight event at the 1960 Summer Olympics.

References

External links
 

1938 births
Living people
Burmese male boxers
Olympic boxers of Myanmar
Boxers at the 1960 Summer Olympics
Sportspeople from Yangon
Asian Games medalists in boxing
Boxers at the 1958 Asian Games
Boxers at the 1962 Asian Games
Asian Games silver medalists for Myanmar
Medalists at the 1958 Asian Games
Flyweight boxers